Garvaghey or Garvaghy is a townland and hamlet in County Tyrone, Northern Ireland.

It is between Ballygawley (about 5 miles to the southeast) and Omagh (about 11 miles to the northwest). 

Carvaghey is in the Parish of Errigal Ciaran. The Garvaghey Centre is in Garvaghey in which the home county team (Tyrone) usually trains.

Poet John Montague was born in New York City on 28 February 1929, and raised in Garvaghey.

References

Villages in County Tyrone